Clericus may refer to:

 Jean Leclerc (Le Clerc), also  (1657-1736), a Swiss theologian and biblical scholar
 Franciscus Clericus
 Tagiades clericus, a spread-winged skipper butterfly belonging to the family Hesperiidae
 Clericus Cup, a football tournament involving Catholic priests and seminarians

See also 
 Clark (disambiguation)
 Clerc
 Clerck
 Clerk
 Le Clerc
 Klerck
 Klerk
 Leclerc (disambiguation)

Latin words and phrases
Latin-language surnames